Quinatzin (full name: Quinatzin Tlaltecatzin) (kinat͡sin t͡ɬaltekat͜sin) was a King of ancient Texcoco, an Acolhua city-state in Mexico. He was the first known ruler of that city and is also known as Quinatzin II.

It was Quinatzin who transferred the seat of Chichimec power to Texcoco, relegating the city of Tenayuca to a site of secondary importance.

The father of Quinatzin was Tlotzin Pochotl, and a noblewoman called Icpacxochitl.

Quinatzin’s wife was a Princess from Huexotla, Queen Cuauhcihuatzin, mother of his successor Techotlalatzin. Her grandson was Ixtlilxochitl I.

Quinatzin’s mother-in-law was called Tomiyauh.

See also
Mapa Quinatzin, a 16th-century Nahua pictorial document

Notes 

Mexican nobility
Tlatoque of Texcoco
14th-century monarchs
14th-century deaths
Year of birth unknown